I. H. Sangam Dev is a Kannadiga investigative journalist. He was born and brought up in Kolar in Karnataka, India.

His talent in investigation and narration was recognised when he was working as an associate editor of a local paper called Honnudi. He is currently the editor in chief of the Kannada eveninger, Sanje Nudi, published from Bengaluru. He was one of the associates of Ravi Belagere of Hi Bangalore before splitting up due to ethical differences. He worked as a chief reporter in Lankesh Patrike for some time as well before starting his own evening newspaper.

References

People from Kolar
Living people
Journalists from Karnataka
Year of birth missing (living people)